Francisleide dos Santos Barbosa (born February 27, 1990), known as Chú Santos or Chú, is a Brazilian professional footballer who plays as a forward for the Brazil women's national football team and Palmeiras in Brazil.

Football career
Francisleide dos Santos Barbosa was born in Rio de Janeiro, Brazil, on February 27, 1990. She is better known as Chú Santos, or simply Chú. When she was seven years old, Santos told her grandfather that she enjoyed playing football; in response, he took her to a training school. She was initially told that the sport was only for boys, but Santos continued to pursue her career. She was part of the São José Esporte Clube team which won the International Women's Club Championship, defeating English team Arsenal W.F.C. in the final. This was the first time that a Brazilian team had won the competition.

In 2015, she was named as part of the initial squad of the shared women's team between Sport Club Corinthians Paulista and Grêmio Osasco Audax Esporte Clube, known as Corinthians / Audax. When the team made their debut in the Copa do Brasil de Futebol Feminino, Santos scored five times in the 9–0 defeat of Pinheirense Esporte Clube. Santos scored a further two goals in the next two games in the tournament, The team went on to win the tournament, with Santos recording twelve goals during the single tournament, making her a top scorer. The record for number of goals scored in the tournament, is held by Marta, with 18.

She was then signed by Danish club Fortuna Hjørring, whose manager, Brian Sørensen, described her as "a complete player". During her time in Denmark, she only played in two matches; both legs of the quarter final of the UEFA Women's Champions League against Manchester City W.F.C. of England. Santos then resigned for Sao Jose.

International
Santos was first called up to the Brazil women's national football team at the age of 21 in 2012 as part of the main selection round of the team for the 2012 Summer Olympics in London, England.

International goals

Personal life
In 2021, Santos garnered much criticism for mocking the death of recently deceased Brazilian actor Paulo Gustavo. She commented on Facebook that Gustavo was in hell, alluding to his homosexuality as the reason. Brazil teammates Marta, Tamires, Cristiane, and many of her club teammates publicly criticized Santos' comments. Shortly after her comments made national news, Santos released a public apology, saying she spoke on an impulse. Her club team, Palmeiras, released a statement saying they would deal with the matter internally.

References

Living people
1990 births
Brazilian women's footballers
Women's association football forwards
Saad Esporte Clube (women) players
São José Esporte Clube (women) players
Suwon FC Women players
Fortuna Hjørring players
Expatriate women's footballers in South Korea
Expatriate women's footballers in Denmark
Footballers from Rio de Janeiro (city)
Brazilian expatriate women's footballers
Brazilian expatriate sportspeople in Denmark
Brazilian expatriate sportspeople in China
Brazilian expatriate sportspeople in South Korea
Changchun Zhuoyue players
Associação Ferroviária de Esportes (women) players
Associação Desportiva Centro Olímpico players
Expatriate women's footballers in China
Sport Club Corinthians Paulista (women) players
Sociedade Esportiva Palmeiras (women) players